Meteorin-like/Meteorin-Beta (Metrnl)/IL-41, also known as subfatin and cometin, is a small (~27kDa) secreted cytokine, protein encoded by a gene called meteorin-like (METRNL). METRNL, also known as subfatin and cometin, is highly expressed in mucosal tissues, skin and activated macrophages.
Metrnl has also been described to be a hormone

A screen of human skin-associated diseases showed significant over-expression of METRNL in psoriasis, prurigo nodularis, actinic keratosis and atopic dermatitis. METRNL is also up-regulated in synovial membranes of human rheumatoid arthritis.

Adipocyte Metrnl antagonizes obesity-induced insulin resistance by improving adipose function, including adipocyte differentiation, metabolism activation, and inflammation inhibition Lower serum levels of Metrnl might be a risk factor for developing coronary artery disease and type 2 diabetes mellitus

Function 
Metrnl participates in the control of inflammatory responses and is a critical regulator of muscle regeneration.

References

Human proteins
Hormones
Cell signaling
Signal transduction
Cytokines